Battle of Babylon was fought between the forces of Sasanian Empire and Rashidun Caliphate in 634. Muslim Arabs won the encounter to maintain their pursuit of conquering Mesopotamia. After this battle, the Arabs would go on to conquer Ctesiphon and the rest of Iraq from the Persians.

Prelude
Khalid ibn al-Walid already left the leadership of the Muslim army in Iraq as he went to lead a campaign against the Byzantine Empire in Syria. At that time, the Sassanids under Hormozd Jadhuyih wanted to test the Muslim forces after Khalid leaving; therefore, both sides exchanged letters threatening one another. Later on, the Arabs went from Al-Hira to approach their opponents near Babylon.

Battle
The Persian army had a war elephant in order to scare the opponent's horses. Nevertheless, the Arabs led by Al-Muthanna ibn Haritha managed to kill the big elephant and to defeat the Persians who fled the region to Ctesiphon.

References

Battles involving the Sasanian Empire
Battles involving the Rashidun Caliphate
Muslim conquest of Mesopotamia
Military history of Iraq
634